David Jan Paas (born 24 February 1971) is a retired Belgian former professional footballer who played as a striker.

During his career, Paas played for Tongeren, Eendracht Aalst, Vitória Guimarães Harelbeke, Genk and Westerlo.

External links

 

1971 births
Living people
People from Tongeren
Belgian footballers
Association football forwards
Challenger Pro League players
Belgian Pro League players
S.C. Eendracht Aalst players
Primeira Liga players
Vitória S.C. players
K.R.C. Genk players
K.V.C. Westerlo players
Belgian expatriate footballers
Expatriate footballers in Portugal
K.R.C. Zuid-West-Vlaanderen players
Footballers from Limburg (Belgium)